Carlton Banks is a fictional character portrayed by Alfonso Ribeiro on the NBC television sitcom The Fresh Prince of Bel-Air from September 1990 to May 1996, the preppy and politically conservative cousin, main foil, and eventual close friend to Will Smith's cool and street-smart lead character. The character has been praised for portraying a complex and sympathetic foil with an arc of personal growth over the course of the show. The character is also known for a dance with humorously exaggerated movements developed for the character by Ribeiro, which came to be known as "The Carlton". Ribeiro also crossed over his role as Carlton into the In the House episode "Dog Catchers" before returning the following season as series regular Dr. Maxwell Stanton for the remainder of that series' run.

Development and characteristics
Carlton was "an affluent teenager attending private school in the ritzy Bel-Air sub-section of Los Angeles", who wore "button-down collared shirts and sweaters (often knotted around his neck)". He was "notoriously preppy", and a firmly conservative Republican. Writer Andy Borowitz described the character as an effort to portray "the anti-Will". The character was loosely based on the children of Fresh Prince executive producer Quincy Jones, and was named after Borowitz's classmate at Harvard University, Carlton Cuse. However, Carlton "had layers that prevented him from being a one-dimensional snob".

In the 2020 Fresh Prince of Bel-Air Reunion, Smith noted that the show's comedy "was originally centered on the friction between Will and Uncle Phil... but it quickly become evident that the Will-Carlton dynamic would be the series' primary source of humor", and "the tension between Carlton and Will" therefore became "the tension at the heart of the show". Screenwriter Rob Edwards described how he sought to insure that Carlton would not be a "walking punch-line" like some sitcom antagonists, but would be a strong character, capable of effectively challenging the protagonist. Despite his faults, primarily arrogance, insecurity, and naïveté, Carlton is also shown as having a number of qualities that black viewers identified as positive even when they were held up to scorn—honesty, studiousness and dedication to education, and respect for his parents.

In earlier seasons, Carlton made frequent references to virginity (which was by choice), and also planned to attend Princeton (Philip's alma mater). In later seasons, these arcs were both resolved: Carlton did indeed lose his virginity, but was not initially admitted to Princeton. He instead first attended the (fictional) University of Los Angeles, where he briefly managed ULA's student store, the Peacock. However, in the 6th and last season, he finally gained transfer admission to Princeton, and leaves for the East Coast in the series finale. He often proved both friend and foe for Will. Carlton's role model is talk show host Bryant Gumbel and his favorite musician (and guardian angel) is Tom Jones. His favorite actor is William Shatner, whom he annoys by making lame Star Trek jokes. He idolizes Macaulay Culkin because he starred in a highly successful movie that earned millions, and because he is "one heck of an actor!". In the episode "Hex and the Single Man", Carlton went trick-or-treating as Macaulay. In a later episode, it is revealed that Carlton has Santa Claus' fax number, which he has repeatedly used to request admission to Princeton. He is very similar to Family Ties character Alex P. Keaton in that he is a Republican, dresses in a preppy style, is obsessed with money, is short (Ribeiro is 5ft 6.25in, or 168cm), with his height a common butt of jokes by Will, and does not enjoy the popular music of most people his age. In some episodes, it is revealed that when he dances "other than the famous Carlton Dance" he dances very well.

Ribeiro, who had previously been in the cast of the 1980s show Silver Spoons, auditioned wearing a track suit. Carlton was Ribeiro's breakout role, in which he "consistently stole scenes from Will Smith". Ribeiro said that Carlton was a character that he "had a blast playing for six years", but also noted that for many years thereafter, the role caused him to be "pigeon-holed as an actor based on that character".

Carlton Banks is played by Jelani Talib in the 2019 short film Bel-Air, a reimagining of the original show as a modern drama. In September 2020, a two-season series based on the short film was picked up by the streaming service Peacock, with Will Smith as an executive producer commenting on his excitement to explore the characters in this format, specifically referencing "[t]he Carlton character, a Black young Republican, modern day? The heat that will be stirred up between these characters". Olly Sholotan was cast as Carlton in the actual reboot, described in one review as "not the same nerdy Alfonso Ribeiro with a token funny dance. He's almost cool—with toned biceps and a friend circle  lacrosse players".

Fictional character biography

Original series
Born August 4, 1974, Carlton is the son of Vivian and Philip Banks, and Will's pedantic maternal cousin. A quintessential preppy, like many of his social class, Carlton aspires to attend an Ivy League university; in earlier seasons, he states he aims to get into Yale University, but later fixes a determined focus on Princeton University, his father Philip's alma mater.

Like his father Phillip, Carlton is a firmly conservative Republican and this often puts him at odds with Will. Although Carlton and Will often exchange insults, and Will normally refers to Carlton as a disgrace, Carlton obviously cares about Will, referring to him in the 2nd-season episode 'Vying for Attention' as "the brother I've always wanted". At first it appears there is an antagonistic relationship between Will and Carlton, but in later seasons Will significantly warms to Carlton, ultimately accepting Carlton and the other cousins as the siblings he never had. On one occasion in the season three episode "Just Say Yo", Carlton is considerate enough to cover for Will when he is admitted to the hospital after having taken speed tablets from inside Will's locker, but allows his parents to think that Will saved him. He attributes this to "still being high at the time" when asked by Will why he covered for him. This spurs Will to tearfully confess the truth to the family; although Carlton did ingest speed, Will bore responsibility as he had accepted the pills from a school friend, storing them in his locker, then absentmindedly said to Carlton he had a bottle of Vitamin E in his locker. Early on, Carlton is also seen to get extremely jealous almost anytime something great happens to Will. Examples would be when, in the Season One episode "Courting Disaster" Will joins the school basketball team with Carlton already on it. Will becomes the star of the team and Carlton becomes jealous and the competition between the two starts. Carlton decides to steal the ball from Will and take the game winning shot.

Carlton drives a silver Mercedes-Benz E-Class from the early 1990s, which is seen in a few episodes. Carlton also was a bit of a servant to sister Ashley when she hit it big on the singing charts. He held doors open for her and fanned Ashley while she tanned. He is also a big fan of The Jeffersons and Beverly Hills, 90210, the latter of which he is confident enough to admit to others; this is unlike Will, who scoffs at the show in front of friends but confesses to Carlton that he is a secret 90210 fan as well.

Carlton is often called upon to do a comic, usually improvised dance routine to Tom Jones' "It's Not Unusual" (which was inspired by a dance performed by Courteney Cox in the music video for Bruce Springsteen's "Dancing in the Dark"). In earlier seasons, he makes frequent references to his virginity (twice referencing that he plans on losing it at some point), and also plans to attend Princeton University. In later seasons, these arcs are both resolved: Carlton does indeed lose his virginity to a woman who is married to the Dean of Princeton, but is not initially admitted to Princeton; instead he first attends the University of Los Angeles, where he briefly manages ULA's student store, the Peacock Stop.

Carlton makes no secret that he is desperate to lose his virginity. In the season 4 episode "It's Better to Have Loved and Lost It", that's what happens, with a lady, Joanne, with whom he has a one night stand with after an evening at the Tom Jones Museum. He proclaims he lives for her, but she gets back with her husband, who is the dean of Princeton University. 

As seen in the episodes "You Bet Your Life" and "Viva Lost Wages", Carlton also seems to have a gambling problem and loses all of his money in any situation where gambling is involved and constantly imagines the gambling tables and slot machines talking to him, but seems fully aware that he is subject to compulsive gambling, and this limits his exposure to gaming. He usually declares that gambling is "evil" right before he goes all in and loses his and others' money. One exception to this was where he participated in a casino night in the season two episode "Something for Nothing", but that was done for charitable reasons and not for real money. In season five's "Bullets Over Bel-Air", Will tries to protect Carlton when they get robbed after using an automated teller machine, Will gets shot, taking a bullet for Carlton and is sent to the hospital (eventually recovering from his injuries); Carlton acquires a firearm later in the episode, as the event heightens his awareness of the need for self-defense, but later disposes of the handgun upon Will's insistence.

One running joke in the show involves Carlton repeatedly being slapped in the back of the head by various characters, usually in response to comments that are ridiculously self-centered (in later seasons, for example, he would often make humorous comments about gaining his father's inheritance) or due to portraying ignorance of lives other than his own. Often Will would ask to hold what Carlton is holding and once receiving it he would slap Carlton across the head with the object (e.g. a folder containing Will's testament written by Carlton, in "Ill Will"). Carlton's height is frequently made fun of, especially by Will, who, in the episode "Grumpy Young Men", jokes that Carlton is the average height for a woman.

He is sometimes portrayed as being extremely naïve. An example is when, in the episode Mistaken Identity, he and Will are arrested after police officers falsely believe that they stole a Mercedes-Benz belonging to Philip's law firm partner, who requested Will and Carlton drive the vehicle to Palm Springs as a favor. At the end, Carlton insists that the policemen were only doing their job, not really accepting the fact that he and Will were victims of racial profiling. However, he seems to wonder if they were wrong, as when he asks his father if he (Phil) were a policeman if he would pull over someone who was driving too slow, for which Phil answers: "I asked myself the same thing the first time I was stopped"; after that, Carlton seems in deep thought over the situation. Although he was portrayed early on as a snobby rich kid, Carlton evolved after having his view challenged when arrested for "stealing a car" and when Will is shot, Carlton is angered that the shooter will probably not face justice for harming Will.

In the sixth and final season, Carlton finally gains transfer admission to Princeton University however, due to his fear of not living up to Philip's achievements, Carlton decides not to attend Princeton and briefly becomes interested in pursuing a career in bowling. However, he gets over his fear and leaves for the east coast in the series finale. In 2017, Ribeiro speculated that following the events of the series, Carlton would have tried to follow his father's career path, becoming a lawyer and eventually working towards becoming a judge.

Reboot series
The character of Carlton in the 2022 reboot series is more serious of a character, and is initially more hostile to Will. This hostility is exacerbated by Will's flirtation with Lisa, who happens to be his cousin Carlton's ex-girlfriend. Will catches Carlton sniffing Xanax and agrees to stay silent if Carlton helps get Uncle Phil and Aunt Viv to ease up on him. They pretend to make peace and go to a beach party. Will meets Lisa again and kisses her, and a jealous Carlton pushes Will into the pool. Will can't swim, so Lisa pulls him out, and he punches Carlton. Over the course of the season, Carlton warms to Will, who dissuades Carlton from further drug use.

The Carlton
Carlton in the original series was known for frequently dancing a specific set of steps to Tom Jones' "It's Not Unusual", a dance routine that gained fame as "The Carlton". Ribeiro developed the dance, later claiming to have drawn inspiration from the appearance by Courteney Cox in the 1984 music video for Bruce Springsteen's "Dancing in the Dark", and by Eddie Murphy depicting white people dancing in Eddie Murphy Raw. On May 24, 2013, Ribeiro made a cameo appearance on The Graham Norton Show to perform "The Carlton", with show guests Will and Jaden Smith. Ribeiro incorporated the dance into his performance for week four of season 19 of Dancing With the Stars, earning the only perfect 10 of the episode, along the way to winning the season.

In December 2018, NBC and CBS reported that Ribeiro, along with Instagram star Russell Horning, aka Backpack Kid, and rapper Terrence Ferguson, aka 2 Milly, brought a lawsuit against Epic Games for their decision to feature respective choreographies in the popular game Fortnite. "The Carlton" was one of the many dances that Fortnite players can purchase for their avatars. Epic Games declined to comment on the lawsuits. The U.S. Copyright Office denied him a copyright for his dance in January 2019. The Copyright Office described the contested work as "a simple routine made up of three dance steps, the first of which is popularly known as 'The Carlton'", describing the steps for the entire routine as follows:

In March 2019, Ribeiro dropped the lawsuit against Epic Games.

References

Fictional African-American people
Fictional characters from Los Angeles
Television characters introduced in 1990
American male characters in television
American sitcom television characters
The Fresh Prince of Bel-Air
Teenage characters in television
Crossover characters in television